Paul Blobel (13 August 1894 – 7 June 1951) was a German Sicherheitsdienst (SD) commander and convicted war criminal who played a leading role in the Holocaust. He organised and executed the Babi Yar massacre, the largest massacre of the Second World War at Babi Yar ravine in September 1941, pioneered the use of the gas van, and, following re-assignment, developed the gas chambers for the extermination camps in occupied Poland. From late 1942 onwards, he led Sonderaktion 1005, wherein millions of bodies were exhumed at the massacre sites and extermination camps across Eastern Europe in an effort to erase all evidence of the Holocaust and specifically of Operation Reinhard. After the war, Blobel was tried at the Einsatzgruppen Trial and sentenced to death. He was executed in 1951.

Early life
Born in the city of Potsdam, Blobel fought in the First World War as an engineer as part of a pioneer battalion, in which by all accounts he served well, being decorated with the Iron Cross first class. After the war, Blobel studied architecture and practiced this profession from 1924 until 1931, when upon losing his job he joined the Nazi Party, the SA, and the SS (he had joined all of these by 1 December 1931).

SS career

In 1933 Blobel joined the police force in Düsseldorf. In June 1934 he was recruited into the SD Security Service. During World War II, following Operation Barbarossa, in June 1941 Blobel became the commanding officer of [[Sonderkommandos of Einsatzgruppen|Sonderkommando 4a]] of Einsatzgruppe C, active in Reichskommissariat Ukraine. Both, Einsatzgruppen and the Order Police battalions were responsible for massacres of Jews behind the Wehrmacht lines in the Soviet Union. The murder campaign included all political and racial undesirables. In August 1941 Blobel was put in charge of creating a Nazi ghetto in Zhytomyr to enclose around 3,000 Jews who were murdered a month later.  

On 10 or 11 August 1941, Friedrich Jeckeln ordered him, on behalf of Adolf Hitler, to exterminate the entire Jewish population. On 22 August 1941, the Sonderkommando murdered Jewish women and children at Bila Tserkva with the consent of Field Marshal Walther von Reichenau, commander of the 6th Army. SS-Obersturmführer August Häfner testified at his own trial in the 1960s:

Blobel, in conjunction with Reichenau's and Friedrich Jeckeln's units, organised the Babi Yar massacre in late September 1941 in Kyiv, where 33,771 Jews were murdered.  In November 1941, Blobel received and activated the first gas vans at Poltava.

Blobel was officially relieved of his command on 13 January 1942 for health reasons due to alcoholism. This was an elaborate cover, however. Whilst in the hospital, Blobel was visited by Reinhard Heydrich and tasked with a top secret Reich matter that was presumably suspended upon the fatal shooting of Heydrich in Prague by British-trained Czech partisans. During this time, according to Dieter Wisliceny, Blobel developed the concept of the gas chambers for the extermination camps in Poland. In June 1942 Blobel was contacted by Heinrich Müller, Chief of the Gestapo and secretly placed in charge of Sonderaktion 1005 with his official cover being SD Chief of the City of Nuremberg. This secret task consisted of the destruction of the evidence of all Nazi atrocities in Eastern Europe, beginning at Chelmno and continuing on to Sobibor Extermination Camp, Auschwitz, the camps in the Independent State of Croatia, the Baltic States, and eventually back to the site of the Babi Yar Massacre in Ukraine. This entailed exhumation of mass graves, then incinerating the bodies. Blobel developed efficient disposal techniques such as alternating layers of bodies with firewood on a frame of iron rails.

In October 1944 he headed an anti-partisan group in Yugoslavia. Gitta Sereny related the conversation about Blobel she once had with one-time Chief of the Church Information Branch at the Reich Security Head Office, Albert Hartl.

Trial and conviction

Over 59,018 killings are attributable to Blobel, albeit he personally claimed to have killed 10,000–15,000 people. He was later sentenced to death by the U.S. Nuremberg Military Tribunal in the Einsatzgruppen trial. He was hanged at Landsberg Prison shortly after midnight on 7 June 1951.

Blobel's last words were "Whatever I have done, I did as a soldier who obeyed orders. I have committed no crime. I will be vindicated by God and history. God have mercy on those who murder me."

In the media
 Blobel was portrayed by actor T. P. McKenna in the 1978 miniseries Holocaust.
 Blobel is an historical character in Herman Wouk's book War and Remembrance''. He was portrayed by actor Kenneth Colley in the television adaptation of the book.

References

1894 births
1951 deaths
People from Potsdam
Executed people from Brandenburg
German Army personnel of World War I
Recipients of the Iron Cross (1914), 1st class
Sturmabteilung personnel
SS-Standartenführer
Einsatzgruppen personnel
Babi Yar
Holocaust perpetrators in Poland
Holocaust perpetrators in Ukraine
Holocaust perpetrators in Yugoslavia
Executions by the United States Nuremberg Military Tribunals
Executed mass murderers